HVF may refer to:
 HVF, station code for Haverfordwest railway station, in Wales
 Heavy Vehicles Factory, an Indian defence company
 Les Herbiers VF, a French football club
 Hillary Victory Fund, a US fundraiser